Stanisław Lech Woronowicz (born 22 July 1941, Ukmergė, Lithuania) is a Polish mathematician and physicist. He is affiliated with the University of Warsaw and is a member of the Polish Academy of Sciences.

Research
Woronowicz and Erling Størmer classified positive maps in low-dimensional cases, which translate to the Peres-Horodecki criterion in the context of quantum information theory. He is also known for contributions to quantum groups.

Awards
Woronowicz was an invited speaker at International Congress of Mathematicians in Warsaw in 1983 and in Kyoto in 1990.

He was awarded Humboldt Research Prize in 2008, and Stefan Banach Medal of the Polish Academy of Sciences in 2009.

References

External links 
 Homepage
 Profile on nLab

1941 births
Living people
20th-century Polish mathematicians
Woronowicz
21st-century Polish mathematicians